Aasta Nielsen (September 29, 1897 – October 24, 1975) was a Norwegian actress.

Nielsen was born in Kristiania (now Oslo), Norway and was a first cousin of the Wagnerian soprano Kirsten Flagstad. She debuted as a theater actress in 1915 and appeared at the Norwegian Theater, the Casino Opera Theater, the Mayol Theater, the Central Theater, and the Stavanger Permanent Theater.

She retired from acting in 1933.

Filmography
 1920: Fante-Anne as Anne ("Fante-Anne")
 1921: Jomfru Trofast as Tone (Miss Faithful)
 1921: Felix as Zazako, Felix's sister

References

External links
 
 Aasta Nielsen at the Swedish Film Database

1897 births
1975 deaths
20th-century Norwegian actresses
Actresses from Oslo